Henry Nevins may refer to:
Henry B. Nevins (1878–1950), yacht builder
Henry Coffin Nevins (1843–1892), industrialist

See also
Henry B. Nevins, Incorporated
Henry C. Nevins Home for Aged and Incurables

Human name disambiguation pages